The California tiger salamander (Ambystoma californiense) is a vulnerable amphibian native to California. It is a mole salamander. Previously considered to be a subspecies of the tiger salamander (A. tigrinum), the California tiger salamander was recently designated a separate species again.  The California tiger salamander distinct population segment (DPS) in Sonoma County and the Santa Barbara County DPS are listed as federally endangered, while the  Central California DPS is listed as federally threatened. The Sonoma County, south San Joaquin, and the Santa Barbara County DPS have diverged from the rest of the California tiger salamander populations for over one million years, since the Pleistocene and they may warrant status as separate species.

Description 

The California tiger salamander is a relatively large, secretive amphibian endemic to California. Adults can grow to a total length of about 7–8 inches. It has a stocky body and a broad, rounded snout. Adults are black with yellow or cream spots; larvae are greenish-grey in color. The California tiger salamander has brown protruding eyes with black irises.

Habitat and range 

The California tiger salamander depends on vernal pools and other seasonal ponds and stock ponds for reproduction; its habitat is limited to the vicinity of large, fishless vernal pools or similar water bodies. It occurs at elevations up to 1000 m (3200 ft). Adults migrate at night from upland habitats to aquatic breeding sites beginning with the first major rainfall of fall and winter, and return to upland habitats after breeding.

Historically, the California tiger salamander probably occurred in grassland habitats throughout much of the state. It occurs from Sonoma County, especially in the Laguna de Santa Rosa (outside the floodplain), south to Santa Barbara County, in vernal pool complexes and isolated ponds along the Central Valley from Colusa County to Kern County, and in the coastal range. Both the Sonoma and Santa Barbara populations are listed as endangered since 2000 and 2003, respectively. On August 4, 2004, the US Fish and Wildlife Service listed the California tiger salamander as threatened within the Central DPS.

The six populations are found in Sonoma County, the Bay Area (Stanislaus County, western Merced County, and most of San Benito County), the Central Valley, the southern San Joaquin Valley, the Central Coast Range, and Santa Barbara County.

The loss of California tiger salamander populations has been due primarily to the loss of habitat and predators, such as American bullfrogs and access to breeding habitats. There is also a viable hybrid between the California tiger salamander and the introduced barred tiger salamander (Ambystoma tigrinum mavortium), which genetic evidence suggests have been hybridizing for 50–60 years.

Life cycle 

Adults spend the majority of their lives underground, in burrows created by other animals, such as ground squirrels and  gophers; these salamanders are poorly equipped for burrowing. Little is known about their underground life.  This underground phase has often been referred to as estivation (the summertime equivalent of hibernation), but true estivation has never been observed, and fiber optic cameras in burrows have allowed researchers to witness salamanders actively foraging. Adults are known to eat earthworms, snails, insects, fish, and even small mammals but adult California tiger salamanders eat very little.

Reproduction

Breeding takes place after the first rains in late fall and early winter, when the wet season allows the salamanders to migrate to the nearest pond, a journey that may be as far as a 1.3 miles and take several days. The eggs, which the female lays in small clusters or singly, hatch after 10 to 14 days. The larval period lasts for three to six months.  However, California tiger salamander larvae may also "overwinter". Transformation for overwintering larvae may take 13 months or more. Recent discoveries, such as overwintering, have management implications for this threatened species, particularly when aquatic habitats undergo modification.  The larvae feed on other small invertebrates, including tadpoles. When their pond dries, they resorb their gills, develop lungs, and then the metamorphs leave the pond in search of a burrow.

"... the average female bred 1.4 times and produced 8.5 young that survived to metamorphosis per reproductive event, resulting in roughly 12 lifetime metamorphic offspring per female."

California tiger salamanders can live up to 15 years.

See also
Vernal pools or ponds

References
 California Natural Diversity Database California Natural Diversity Database

External links 

Santa Rosa Plain Conservation Strategy  Santa Rosa Plain Conservation Strategy
Description from the California Department of Fish and Game.
USGS Field Guide

Mole salamanders
Salamanders
Amphibians of the United States
Fauna of the California chaparral and woodlands
Natural history of the California Coast Ranges
Natural history of the Central Valley (California)
Taxa named by John Edward Gray
Endangered fauna of California
Amphibians described in 1853